Over the millennia of its development, Hinduism has adopted several iconic symbols, forming part of  Hindu iconography, that are imbued with spiritual meaning based on either the scriptures or cultural traditions. The exact significance accorded to any of the icons varies with region, period and denomination of the followers. Over time some of the symbols, for instance the Swastika has come to have wider association while others like Om are recognized as unique representations of Hinduism. Other aspects of Hindu iconography are covered by the terms murti, for icons and mudra for gestures and positions of the hands and body.

Hindu sacraments  
Hindu sacraments are physical pieces of that help objects or markings that are considered sacred and used as a sign of devotion by the followers of Sanathana Dharma (Hinduism). These are often objects associated with a puja (prayer) or religious ceremony.

Murti 
Murtis are statues and idols of Hindu Gods. They are a huge part of Hindu culture and a commodity in many Hindu homes. Many believe that murtis are vessels that capture the essence of Gods, which helps the devotees focus and concentrate during prayers. Although, there are many Hindu Gods, the most common Murtis are depictions of Ganesha, Hanuman, Shiva, and Mother Lakshmi. Each God appeals to certain aspects of human life, for example Lakshmi is the goddess of fortune and the embodiment of love, while Hanuman is worshiped for strength and loyalty. Murtis are physical references to God and allow Hindus to pray more effectively, while regulating the religious market

Tilaka 
The tilaka (or tilak) is a mark worn on the forehead or other parts of the body as a sign of  spiritual devotion. Hindus may wear a tilaka regularly or especially on religious occasions. The shape of the tilaka is often an indicator of devotion to a certain deity. For example, a 'U' shape tilaka usually denotes devotion to Vishnu, while Shiva devotees often wear it in the form of three horizontal lines. It may be made of saffron, vermilion, turmeric, clay or simply ash.

To denote marriage and auspiciousness, married Hindu women commonly wear a decorative vermilion dot or bindu, or bindī on the forehead. This is analogous to a wedding ring worn in western countries. In southern India, the mark is called pottu (or bottu). The exact shape, size and location of the bindi or pottu shows regional variation; for instance, in northern India the bindi is often worn just below the hairline, while in southern India it is more common to wear it between the eyebrows. In east India, especially in West Bengal, traditionally larger bindis are worn as mark of  devotion towards Goddess Durga.

Vibhuti 
Vibhuti (☰) is the holy ash obtained from sacred puja rites involving fire. Also a variant called Basma used as Vibhuti is prepared from the purified ashes of cow dung. Ash is considered a sign of purity due to its powdery white color. It is used on the forehead, normally as three horizontal lines representing Shiva. Some Hindus meld both the three horizontal vibhuti lines of Shiva and the 'U' shape thilaka of Vishnu in an amalgam marker signifying Hari-Hara (Vishnu-Shiva). In addition, sacred ash signifies that the body's origin is from dust and ash and to dust and ash it shall return. The ash is a marker of impermanence. Everything in the interim is but an illusion (maya).

Vibhuti, when applied to the forehead, also symbolizes the willingness to destroy negative thoughts and qualities (jealousy, envy, anger, greed, etc.), as these negative qualities, if not destroyed, will bring all kinds of pains in life

Rudraksha 

Rudraksha (📿) are seeds of the rudraksha tree that, in Hinduism, represent the tears of Lord Shiva (also known as, Rudra). They are often threaded into a necklace and used as a rosary to accompany prayer and meditation.

Universal symbols 
Among the most revered symbols in Hinduism, three are a quintessential part of its culture, and are most representative of its general ethos:

Om (pronounced Aum) 

Om (or Aum, ॐ) is the sacred sound symbol that represents Universe; the ultimate reality (Brahman). It is prefixed and sometimes suffixed to all Vedic mantras and prayers. Aum is often said to represent God in the three aspects of  Brahman (A),  Vishnu (U) and Shiva (M). As the Divine primordial vibration, it represents the one ultimate reality , underlying and encompassing all of nature and all of existence.  The written syllable  ॐ called omkara serves as a deeply significant and distinctly recognizable symbol for Hindu dharma. The pronunciation of Aum moves through all possible human linguistic vowel sounds and is different from the pronunciation of Om.  Both are often symbolically equated, although they are sonically distinct.

Swastika 
Swastika is a symbol connoting general auspiciousness. It may represent purity of soul, truth, and stability or, alternatively, Surya, the sun. Its rotation in four directions has been used to represent many ideas, but primarily describes the four directions, the four Vedas and their harmonious whole. Its use in Hinduism dates back to ancient times, however the earliest records of Swastikas were imprinted on pottery from  central Mesopotamia and at Susa in western Iran in 4000 B.C.

Sri Chakra Yantra 
Sri Chakra  Yantra of Tripura Sundari (commonly referred to as Sri Yantra) is a mandala formed by nine interlocking triangles.  Four of these triangles are oriented upright, representing Shiva or the Masculine.  Five of these triangles are inverted triangles representing  Shakti, or the Feminine.  Together, the nine triangles form a web symbolic of the entire cosmos, a womb symbolic of creation, and together express Advaita Vedanta or non-duality.  All other yantras are derivatives of this supreme yantra.

Symbols associated with individual deities

Several symbols (animals, flora, instruments, weapons, or even color) in Hindu iconography are associated with particular devas, and vice versa. In certain cases the deities themselves are personifications of natural forces, for instance Agni (fire), Vayu (wind), Surya (Sun) and Prithvi (Earth). In other instances, the associations arise from specific incidents or characteristics related in Hindu theology. The iconography serve to identify the particular deity in their pictorial or sculptural representations. The symbolism also often links the deities with a particular natural or human attribute, or profession.

It is important to understand the symbolism, in order to appreciate the allegorical references in not only Hindu scriptures (for instance, Puranic tales), but also in both ancient and modern secular works of authors from the Indian subcontinent. The art and science of designing temples includes the study of sculpture and the ornamentation of religious significance as described in sacred texts (shilpa shaastra aagamas). In Ancient India twelve years of theoretical and practical training used to be given to the student by an able experienced teacher.

Shiva Lingam 

The Shiva Lingam represents the deity Shiva, and is used as an icon of strength and fertility due to its sexual symbolism. Shivalinga (Sivalinga) is the most important and a popular symbolic representation of Shiva in Hinduism. It represents Shiva in his aspects of the creator, protector, and the destroyer in Shaiva traditions

Meaning
The word ‘Shivalinga’ is a combination of the words ‘Shiva’ (auspiciousness) and linga (sign or symbol). Thus ‘Shivalinga’ is a representation of Shiva in His all-auspicious aspect. Linga has been translated as phallus, which refers to his aspect of the masculine principle. ‘Linga’ also means the place of dissolution of the disintegrated universe.

Types
Based on the mobility of the object of worship, Shivalingas are broadly divided into two categories – ‘Cala’ and ‘Acala’

Cala Shivalinga
These are made of stone, crystal, metals, clay, rice, dough, etc. These can be moved from one place to another.

Acala Shivalingas

The sacred texts describe many types of the lingas based on variations in the proportion

Shivalingas are installed in temples and are fixed to ground or a base. They are usually made of stones or metals. The sacred texts suggest that the shiva linga must have three parts. A bottom most 1/3rd part that is in the earth - Brahma bhagam (represents Brahma, the Creator of the World) it is rectangular in cross section. 
A middle 1/3rd part is called Vishnu bhagam or Vishnu Bhaga (it represents Vishnu, the Protector and sustainer of the world; it is octagonal in cross section. Both the Brahma bhagam and Vishnu bhagam are embedded in peetham (the ornamental pedestal). A visible 1/3rd Shiva Pooja bhagam or Pooja bhaga (also known as Rudra bhagam or Rudra bhaga) which is top most part which is worshiped. It is circular in cross section and cylindrical in shape. It represents Rudra (Shiva), the destroyer of the world. It is known as Pooja bhagam because this part is worshipped. Brahmasutras: These are certain essential lines present on the Rudra  bhagam (Rudra  bhaga). Without them a Shivlinga is unfit to be worshipped. The Shiva linga is at the level of ground and easily accessible to the worshipers irrespective of their caste, social or economic status.

Lotus 

The lotus is associated with the creation theology as well as the gods Vishnu, Brahma, and Lakshmi. It is the symbol of beauty and fertility. "In the Bhagavad Gita, a human is adjured to be like the lotus; they should work without attachment, dedicating their actions to God, untouched by sin like water on a lotus leaf, like a beautiful flower standing high above the mud and water."

Veena 
The musical instrument Veena is associated with the Hindu goddess Saraswati and the sage Narada. Its origin lies in south India as it was used in Carnatic classical music. Furthermore its a symbol of arts and learning.

Conch 

A Hindu pundit (priest) blowing the conch during puja.

The conch shell is a major Hindu article of prayer, used as a trumpeting announcement of all sorts. The God of Preservation, Vishnu, is said to hold a special conch, Panchajanya, that represents life as it has come out of life-giving waters. In the story of Dhruva the divine conch plays a special part. The warriors of ancient India would blow conch shells to announce battle, such as is famously represented in the beginning of the war of Kurukshetra in the Mahabharata, a famous Hindu epic. The conch shell is also a deep part of Hindu symbolic and religious tradition. Today most Hindus use the conch as a part of their religious practices, blowing it during worship at specific points, accompanied by ceremonial bells. Shankha also symbolizes the sound that created the universe and stands for knowledge.

Chakra 
The Chakra or disc-like weapon of Vishnu is often found mounted on the top of Vaishnava temples or incorporated into architectural designs. Images depicting Vishnu's four-armed Narayana form almost always include the Chakra in one of his hands. It is a general symbol for protection. Chakra is also known to symbolize the need to follow dharma and to condemn adharma.

Multiple heads and arms 
 
An array of Hindu, Buddhist, and some Jain deities are often depicted with multiple heads, arms, and other body parts, creating what one author refers to as a "multiplicity convention" in religious iconography. Such multiple body parts represent the divine omnipresence and immanence (ability to be in many places at once and simultaneously exist in all places at once), and thereby the ability to influence many things at once. The specific meanings attributed to the multiple body parts of an image are symbolic, not literal in context. In such depictions, the visual effect of an array of multiple arms is to create a kinetic energy showing that ability. Several Hindu deities are depicted in their Panchamukha (five-faced) aspect, as well as their Chaturbhuja (four-armed) aspect.

Vāhana 

Vāhana or vehicle, sometimes called a mount, is an animal or mythical entity closely associated with a particular deity in Hindu theology. Sometimes the deity is iconographically depicted riding and/or mounted on the vahana; other times, the vahana is depicted at the deity's side or symbolically represented as a divine attribute.

Vishnu
Vishnu is the Protector-God, also the God of Destruction. Of the three gods of the Hindu Triad, Vishnu, being the Preserver, appears most human. The Rig Vedic Vishnu is conceived as the sun in three stages - rising, zenith and setting. The Vedic Vishnu strides through the heavens in three steps. This is Vishnu's great deed and constitutes his great glory. With these three steps Vishnu, a solar deity, courses through the three divisions of the universe, "the god being manifest in a threefold form, as Agni on earth, Indra or Vayu in the atmosphere and Surya in the sky". He is said to have taken these three steps for the preservation and benefit of mortals. The zenith is appropriately called Vishnu's place. His third step cannot be seen with human eyes. It is here that Indra dwells.

Table of symbols

Gopura
It is the tower that was built on the wall of entrance. It was many storied building, up to one storied to sixteen storied. It contains many portico like kudaivarai, prasthra, karnakuta, sala, panchara, kudu. It can be seen mainly in south Indian temples with Dravidian architecture.

See also
 Ashtamangala

References
Notes

Sources
 Vastu-Silpa Kosha, Encyclopedia of Hindu Temple architecture and Vastu/S.K.Ramachandara Rao, Delhi, Devine Books, (Lala Murari Lal Chharia Oriental series)  (Set).
 Kaasyapa shilpa shaastra: part-2- department of endowments - andhra pradesh - India.
 Bhaarathiya mahashilpamu: in 16 parts - swarna subramanya kavi - 1971 TTD Govt of Andhra pradesh supported publication.

Further reading
 Rao, T. A. Gopinatha (1998). Elements of Hindu Iconography (in 4 Parts), New Delhi: Motilal Banarsidass, 
 Jansen, Eva Rudy (1993). The book of Hindu Imagery: Gods, Manifestations and Their Meaning. Binkey Kok Publications, Havelte, The Netherlands. .
 Dr G Gnanananda, "Pratima Lakshana - complete information on the characteristics of gods like Ganesh, Skanda, Aiyappa and Brahma for carving idols:, Bangalore.
 Dr G Gnanananda, "Adranareeshvara Sampradayika shilpa (2019) : Iconography and traditional sculptural qualities, characteristic and methodologies are explained in detail" Sanskriti Sahithya Pratisthana, Bangalore Publications.

External links

The Metropolitan Museum of Art: Recognizing the Gods
Hindu Symbols

 
Indian sculpture
Indian art
Indian iconography